High time-resolution astrophysics (HTRA) is a section of astronomy/astrophysics involved in measuring and studying astronomical phenomena in time scales of 1 second and smaller (t.b.c.). This breed of astronomy has developed with higher efficiency detectors and larger telescopes to get more photons per second along with better computers to store and analyse the vast amounts of data acquired in one night.

Pre-existing objects can now fall into this category such as gamma-ray burst optical transients and pulsars, although this relatively new science is concentrated in the optical/infrared regime and time limits are yet to be set as to what is high time-resolution.

External links 
 Opticon:HTRA

Observational astronomy
Astrophysics